Zavat-e Gharb (also Romanized as Z̄avāt-e Gharb; also known as Z̄avāt) is a village in Kelarestaq-e Sharqi Rural District, in the Central District of Chalus County, Mazandaran Province, Iran. At the 2006 census, its population was 273, in 68 families.

References 

Populated places in Chalus County